Anggulo (English: Angle) is an investigative news program hosted by Luchi Cruz-Valdes. It airs on Thursdays at 7:30-8:30 p.m. (PST) on AksyonTV and Wednesdays at 11:30pm-12:00 midnight (PST) on TV5.

Format
The show focuses on different personalities in politics, showbiz and sports. It shows three different sides of the story and their everyday lives.

Hosts

Main host
 Luchi Cruz-Valdez

Main correspondents
 Chi Bocobo 
 Laila Chikadora 
 Benjie Dorango
 Jove Francisco
 Maricel Halili 
 Maeanne Los Baños 
 Twink Macaraeg 
 Roices Naguit-Sibal
 Ina Zara

See also
News5 
List of programs aired by TV5 (Philippine TV network) 
List of programs aired by AksyonTV/5 Plus

TV5 (Philippine TV network) original programming
AksyonTV original programming
Philippine documentary television series
2011 Philippine television series debuts
2012 Philippine television series endings
Filipino-language television shows